Koloonella laxa is a species of sea snail, a marine gastropod mollusk in the family Murchisonellidae, the pyrams and their allies.

Distribution
This marine species  occurs off Queensland, Australia.

References

 Laseron, C. (1959). The family Pyramidellidae (Mollusca) from northern Australia. Australian Journal of Marine and Freshwater Research. 10 : p. 247

External links
 To World Register of Marine Species

Murchisonellidae
Gastropods described in 1886